Geoffrey Edward Harvey Grigson (2 March 1905 – 25 November 1985) was a British poet, writer, editor, critic, exhibition curator, anthologist and naturalist. In the 1930s he was editor of the influential magazine New Verse, and went on to produce 13 collections of his own poetry, as well as compiling numerous anthologies, among many published works on subjects including art, travel and the countryside. Grigson exhibited in the London International Surrealist Exhibition at New Burlington Galleries in 1936, and in 1946 co-founded the Institute of Contemporary Arts. Grigson's autobiography The Crest on the Silver was published in 1950. At various times he was involved in teaching, journalism and broadcasting. Fiercely combative, he made many literary enemies.

Life and work
Grigson was born at the vicarage in Pelynt, a village near Looe in Cornwall. His childhood in rural Cornwall had a significant influence on his poetry and writing. As a boy, his love of objects of nature (plants, bones and stones) was sparked at the house of family friends at Polperro who were painters and amateur naturalists. He was educated at St John's School, Leatherhead, and at St Edmund Hall, Oxford.

After graduating from Oxford University, Grigson took a job at the London office of the Yorkshire Post, from where he moved on to become literary editor of the Morning Post. He first came to prominence in the 1930s as a poet, then as editor from 1933 to 1939 of the influential poetry magazine New Verse. Among important works by many influential poets — notably Louis MacNeice, Stephen Spender, Dylan Thomas, W. H. Auden, Paul Éluard and Grigson himself — New Verse featured concrete poetry by the sculptor Alberto Giacometti (translated by David Gascoyne) and folk poetry from tribal villages of the Jagdalpür Tahsil district of Bastar State, Chhattisgarh, transcribed from the Halbi language by Grigson's brother Wilfrid Grigson. During this period, Grigson published some of his own poetry under the pseudonym Martin Boldero. An anthology of poems that appeared in the first 30 issues of New Verse was published in hardback by Faber & Faber in 1939, and re-published in 1942; the second edition states that the first "came out on the day war was declared".

During World War II, Grigson worked in the editorial department of the BBC Monitoring Service at Wood Norton near Evesham, Worcestershire, and as a talks producer for the BBC at Bristol.

In 1946, Grigson was one of the founders of the Institute of Contemporary Arts (ICA) in London, together with Roland Penrose, Herbert Read, Peter Watson and Peter Gregory. In 1951, Grigson curated an exhibition of drawings and watercolours drawn from the British Council Collection, which for three decades toured worldwide to 57 art galleries and museums. The exhibition consisted of more than 100 works, including those of David Bomberg, Edward Burra, Cecil Collins, John Craxton, Frances Hodgkins, Barbara Hepworth, Augustus John, David Jones, Wyndham Lewis, John Minton, Henry Moore, Paul Nash, Ben Nicholson, Eduardo Paolozzi, John Piper, Graham Sutherland and Edward Wadsworth.

Later in life, he was a noted critic, reviewer (for the New York Review of Books in particular), and compiler of numerous poetry anthologies. He published 13 collections of poetry, and wrote on travel, on art (notably works on Samuel Palmer, Wyndham Lewis and Henry Moore; he also had a volatile friendship with the painter John Piper), on the English countryside, and on botany, among other subjects. In 1951, he was General Editor of the 13-volume About Britain series of regional guidebooks published by William Collins to coincide with the Festival of Britain. After the repression of the Hungarian Revolution of 1956, at the initiative of Stephen Spender, Grigson joined a group of British writers and artists who applied for visas to visit dissidents in Hungary. The visas were refused.

Grigson was the castaway featured in an edition of Roy Plomley's Desert Island Discs on BBC Radio 4 first broadcast on 16 October 1982. In 1984, he was interviewed by Hermione Lee in an edition of Channel 4's Book Four.

Grigson in his later life lived partly in Wiltshire, England, and partly in a cave house in Trôo, a troglodyte village in the Loir-et-Cher département in France, which features in his poetry. He died in 1985 in Broad Town, Wiltshire, and is buried there in Christ Church churchyard.

Family
Born in 1905, Grigson was the youngest of seven sons of Canon William Shuckforth Grigson (1845–1930), a Norfolk clergyman who had settled in Cornwall as vicar of Pelynt, and Mary Beatrice Boldero, herself the daughter of a clergyman. The inscription on his father's slate headstone in Pelynt Churchyard is the work of Eric Gill, 1931. Five of Grigson's six brothers died serving in the First and Second World Wars, among them John Grigson. This was one of the highest rates of mortality suffered by any British family during the conflicts of the 20th century. Grigson's one surviving brother, Wilfrid Grigson, was killed in an air crash in 1948 while serving as a post-Partition official in Pakistan.

Geoffrey Grigson's first wife was Frances Franklin Galt (who died in 1937 of tuberculosis). With her, he founded the poetry magazine New Verse. They had one daughter, Caroline (who was married to designer Colin Banks). With his second wife, Berta Emma Kunert, Grigson had two children, Anna and Lionel Grigson. Following divorce from his second wife, Grigson married Jane Grigson, née McIntire (1928–90). Their daughter is Sophie Grigson. Among Grigson's grandchildren is the political scientist Giacomo Benedetto.

Honours and legacy
Grigson was awarded the Duff Cooper Prize for his 1971 volume of poetry Discoveries of Bones and Stones. A collection of tributes entitled Grigson at Eighty, compiled by R. M. Healey (Cambridge: Rampant Lions Press), was published in 1985, the year of his death. In 2005, to mark the centenary of Grigson's birth a conference was held at St Edmund Hall, Oxford.

In 2007, Pallant House Gallery in Chichester presented the exhibition Poets in the Landscape: The Romantic Spirit in British Art. The exhibition explored "the creative links between poetry, the pastoral vision and British art in the work of Romantic artists of the 18th and 19th centuries, and the Neo-Romantic artists of the mid-20th century", with exhibits of Grigson’s anthology The Poet's Eye, featuring lithographs by John Craxton, and copies of New Verse.

In 2017, the British Museum presented a major exhibition of British landscape paintings from the century following the death of J. M. W. Turner. The exhibition title was "borrowed from the poet and critic Geoffrey Grigson's 1949 collection of essays Places of the Mind", and, in doing so, "acknowledges how every landscape drawing is a construct of the mind and imagination of its creator".

Works

References

Further reading

 Barfoot, C. C., and R. M. Healey (eds), "My Rebellious and Imperfect Eye": Observing Geoffrey Grigson, DQR Studies in Literature 33. Amsterdam/New York: Rodopi, 2002. (Contains a comprehensive Geoffrey Grigson bibliography.) 
 Ostrom, Hans. "The Mint," in British Literary Magazines: The Modern Age, 1914–1984. Ed. Alvin Sullivan. Westport: Greenwood Press, 1986, 264–267. (Grigson edited The Mint.)

External links
 Geoffrey Grigson page at Faber.
 "Geoffrey Grigson – alumnus of St Edmund Hall, Oxford".
 Julian Symons, "Grigson, Geoffrey Edward Harvey (1905–1985)", rev. Oxford Dictionary of National Biography, Oxford University Press, 2004; online edn, May 2009, accessed 2 December 2013.
 "Geoffrey Grigson – Poet, writer, critic, broadcaster, 1905–1985" at colander.org
 I. Woncewas, "A Centenary Reconsideration: Thinking About Geoffrey Grigson". Parameter Magazine.
 "Correspondence. William Empson and Geoffrey Grigson on climbers, criticism, and the morality of rudeness", Poetry Foundation.
 "Geoffrey Grigson" at My Poetic Side.

1905 births
1985 deaths
English literary critics
People from Pelynt
Poets from Cornwall
People educated at St John's School, Leatherhead
Alumni of St Edmund Hall, Oxford
20th-century English poets
Anthologists
English essayists
English naturalists
20th-century essayists
20th-century male writers
20th-century naturalists